Edward Bartels Banks (1 January 1836 – 22 May 1883) was a lawyer who became a politician and a member of the newly established Reichstag (German parliament) in 1871.  His great grandfather, William Banks, was an English merchant who had relocated to Hamburg.

Life
Banks came from a political family.   His father, Edward Banks (1795–1851), was a Hamburg Syndicus while his maternal grandfather, Johann Heinrich Bartels (1761–1851) had been a mayor of the city.   A brother in law was the writer-historian  (1812–1891).

He attended school in Hamburg and Lübeck, before moving on to study Law at Tübingen and Göttingen.   While at Tübingen he became a member of the Germania student fraternity.   After an eighteen-month world tour, in 1860 he settled back in Hamburg to work as a lawyer.   In 1865  joined the firm.

In 1866 Banks was elected to the Hamburg Parliament where he sat as a member of the left-wing group.   In 1870 he served in the militia in the war against France, and following unification stood successfully for election to the new German Reichstag as a Progressive Party candidate, representing a Hamburg electoral district.   In the 1874 election  he lost his seat to the National Liberal  but was still able to gain a seat in the 1874 assembly, representing a Berlin constituency following a bye-election.   He lost his seat in 1877, however.

In May 1883 Edward Banks killed himself.

References

1836 births
1883 deaths
German people of English descent
German Lutherans
German Progress Party politicians
Members of the Hamburg Parliament
Members of the 1st Reichstag of the German Empire
Members of the 2nd Reichstag of the German Empire
19th-century Lutherans